Pende (Phende) is a Bantu language of the Congo. Giphende is spoken in Bandundu Province, in Gungu and Idiofa districts. The Bapende used to call themselves Akwa Nzumba (in Kasai), Akwa Thunda (in Gungu), or Akwa Mbongo (in Idiofa).

References

Pende languages
Languages of the Democratic Republic of the Congo